The 1999 Individual Speedway Junior World Championship was the 23rd edition of the World motorcycle speedway Under-21 Championships. The event was won by Lee Richardson of England and he also gained qualification to the Speedway Grand Prix Challenge.

World final
August 8, 1999
 Vojens, Speedway Center

References

1999
World I J
1999 in Danish motorsport
Speedway competitions in Denmark